Vincent Samways (born 27 October 1968) is an English former professional footballer and manager who played as a central midfielder from 1986 until 2006.

He notably played in the Premier League for Tottenham Hotspur and Everton. He also played in the Football League for Wolverhampton Wanderers, Birmingham City and Walsall, and in Spain for Sevilla, Las Palmas and Algeciras. After retiring he went on to manage Spanish lower league side San Pedro.

Playing career
Samways was born in Bethnal Green, London, and began his football career in Tottenham Hotspur's youth system. He won the FA Cup with Tottenham in 1991, and helped them reach the semi-finals of the competition in 1993. He was a regular player in the side which reached the quarter-finals of the European Cup Winners' Cup during the 1991–92 season.

Samways was put on the transfer list in the 1992 close season, but was taken off it at his own request and would spend a further two seasons at White Hart Lane.

He joined Everton in 1994, and was part of the Everton squad that reached the 1995 FA Cup Final, but Samways was left out of the team for the final itself. He did however score the only goal of the 1995 Charity Shield to defeat league champions Blackburn Rovers. In the 1995–96 season, he spent time on loan at Division One sides Wolverhampton Wanderers and Birmingham City.

Unable to settle at Everton, Samways enjoyed a degree of success in Spain with UD Las Palmas during the late 1990s and early 2000s, where he was team captain and played a key role in the Canary Islands side. In 2002–03, he played ten league games with Sevilla FC, becoming the first Englishman to play in the Sevilla derby against Real Betis. He then returned to England, where he spent the 2003–04 season with Walsall in Division One.

He then went back to Spain, joining lower league side Algeciras CF, and retired in 2005, aged 36.

Coaching career
After retiring he went on to manage Spanish lower league side San Pedro.

Honours

Tottenham Hotspur
FA Cup: 1990–91
FA Charity Shield: 1991 (shared)

Everton
FA Cup: 1994–95
FA Charity Shield: 1995

References

External links
 
 

Living people
1968 births
Footballers from Bethnal Green
English footballers
Association football midfielders
Tottenham Hotspur F.C. players
Everton F.C. players
Wolverhampton Wanderers F.C. players
Birmingham City F.C. players
UD Las Palmas players
Sevilla FC players
Algeciras CF footballers
Walsall F.C. players
Premier League players
La Liga players
English expatriate footballers
English expatriate sportspeople in Spain
Expatriate footballers in Spain
FA Cup Final players